Alstroemeria orchidioides is a species of monocotyledonous plant belonging to the genus Alstroemeria in the family Alstroemeriaceae, described by Meerow, Tombolato and Friedrich Karl Meyer.

References 

orchidioides